Lachesis is one of the Moirai, the personifications of destiny in Greek mythology. Lachesis may also refer to:

 Lachesis (genus), or bushmasters, a group of venomous pitvipers found in Central and South America
 120 Lachesis, an asteroid
 Lachesis, a character in Fire Emblem: Genealogy of the Holy War